The 1987–88 Arizona Wildcats men's basketball team represented the University of Arizona during the 1987–88 NCAA Division I men's basketball season. The head coach was Lute Olson. The team played its home games in the McKale Center in Tucson, Arizona, and was a member of the Pacific-10 Conference. In the Pacific-10 Basketball tournament, Arizona beat Oregon State by a score of 93–67 to claim its first Pac-10 title. The Wildcats built on that momentum by reaching the Final Four of the NCAA tournament.

Roster

Schedule and results
The victory over Long Beach State in the home opener at McKale Center began a 71-game home court winning streak.

|-
!colspan=12 style=| Non-conference regular season

|-
!colspan=12 style=| Pac-10 regular season

|-
!colspan=12 style=| Pac-10 Tournament

|-
!colspan=12 style=| NCAA Tournament

Sources

NCAA basketball tournament
Seeding in brackets
West
Arizona (1) 90, Cornell (16) 50
Arizona 84, Seton Hall (8) 55
Arizona 99, Iowa (5) 79
Arizona 70, North Carolina (2) 52
Final Four
Oklahoma 86, Arizona 78

Rankings

Awards and honors
Sean Elliott, Pacific-10 Conference men's basketball tournament Most Valuable Player
Sean Elliott, Pacific-10 Player of the Year

Team players in the 1988 NBA Draft

References

Arizona
Arizona Wildcats men's basketball seasons
Pac-12 Conference men's basketball tournament championship seasons
NCAA Division I men's basketball tournament Final Four seasons
Arizona
Arizona Wildcats men's basketball team
Arizona Wildcats men's basketball team